The 2011–12 FAW Women's Cup saw a record number of entrants. 31 teams is six more than last season. Due to the uneven number of clubs, holders Swansea City were given a bye in the first round.

The Cup was won by Cardiff City Ladies F.C.

First round

The draw for the first round is regionalised between North and South Wales .

North:

South

Swansea City Ladies were given a bye. Aberaman Athletic Ladies withdrew from competition, tie awarded to Caerphilly Castle Ladies.

Second round

The draw for the second round took place on Tuesday, 4 October 2011. Matches were scheduled to be played on 30 October 2011, but two were postponed; Those were replayed on 2 and 6 November 2011 respectively.

North:

South:

Quarter-finals
The draw for the quarter-finals took place on 31 October 2011. Matches are to be played no later than 20 November 2011.

Semi-finals
The draw was held on 24 November 2011. Games were held at a neutral venue on 19 February 2012.

Final
The final was held on 22 April 2012.

References

FAW Women's Cup
Women
Cup